Rison may refer to:

People
Andre Rison (born 1967), American football player
Mose Rison (born 1956), American football coach
Vera B. Rison (1939–2015), politician

Places
Rison, Arkansas
Rison High School
Rison, Maryland

See also
 
 Risong, a township in Tibet